The Aviation Traders ATL-98 Carvair is a retired large transport aircraft powered by four radial engines. It was a Douglas DC-4-based air ferry conversion developed by Freddie Laker's Aviation Traders (Engineering) Limited (ATL), with a capacity generally of 22 passengers in a rear cabin, and five cars loaded in at the front.

Design and development
Freddie Laker's idea to convert surplus examples of the Douglas DC-4 and its military counterpart the C-54 Skymaster to carry cars was a relatively inexpensive solution to develop a successor to the rapidly aging and increasingly inadequate Bristol 170 Freighter, the car ferry airlines' mainstay since the late 1940s.

The Bristol Freighter's main drawback was its limited payload, in terms of the number of cars that fit into a single aircraft. Even the "long-nosed" Mark 32 was able to accommodate only three cars (in addition to 20 passengers). This made carrying cars by air a very tricky business. If a booked car failed to turn up, the flight instantly became unprofitable as a result of the one-third cut in payload. This situation was made worse by the increasing average length of British cars during the 1950s. The average UK car in 1959 was  longer than in 1950. The extreme seasonality of the car ferry business furthermore resulted in poor aircraft utilization outside peak periods. Moreover, repeated takeoffs and landings on short cross-Channel flights, in turbulent air at lower altitudes with tight turnarounds of as little as 20 minutes, made the aircraft prone to structural fatigue problems. These necessitated rigorous and costly modification programmes, thereby further increasing the type's operating costs on what were essentially low-yield routes.

When the major airlines replaced their obsolete piston airliners with new Boeing 707 and Douglas DC-8 jets on their prestige long-haul routes, the unit price of second-hand DC-4s dropped to as little as £50,000 (equivalent to £ million today). The conversion of each of these airframes into car-passenger carriers cost about £80,000 (£ million today). This was easily affordable by smaller airlines, such as the car ferry companies. Freddie Laker's cardboard model of a converted DC-4 featuring a door in the nose and a flight deck raised above the fuselage had shown that its payload was superior to the Bristol Freighter/Superfreighter. The aircraft was designed to accommodate five average-sized British cars plus 25 passengers as a result of the DC-4's longer and wider fuselage. British Air Ferries (BAF), for example, operated its Carvairs in a flexible configuration, either accommodating five cars and 22 passengers or two-three cars and 55 passengers, permitting it to change over from one configuration to the other in about 40 minutes. In addition, the DC-4's lack of pressurisation made it ideal for low-altitude cross-Channel flights that did not go high enough to require a pressurised cabin. This made the proposed structural conversion straightforward. The result was a new aircraft christened Carvair (derived from car-via-air).

Initially, it was thought that second-hand, pressurised Douglas DC-6 and Douglas DC-7 airframes could be converted into larger, "second generation" Carvairs within 15 years of the original DC-4-based Carvair's entry into service.

The conversion of the original aircraft entailed replacing the forward fuselage with one  longer, with a raised flightdeck in a bulbous "hump" (akin to the later Boeing 747) to allow a sideways hinged nose door. It also entailed more powerful wheel brakes and an enlarged tail, often thought to be a Douglas DC-7 unit, but actually a completely new design. The engines, four Pratt & Whitney R-2000 Twin Wasps, were unchanged.

The prototype conversion first flew on 21 June 1961. Twenty-one Carvairs were produced in the UK, with production of aircraft 1, 11 and 21 at Southend Airport and the balance at Stansted Airport. The final three aircraft were delivered to Australia's Ansett-ANA, which supplied its own DC-4s to ATL for conversion, unlike the previous 18 aircraft that were purchased by ATL and either sold on or transferred to associate company British United Air Ferries (BUAF). One of the two aircraft still flying in June 2007 was an ex-Ansett airframe. A second Ansett aircraft was abandoned at Phnom Penh in 1975. The first flight of the last conversion, number 21, for Ansett, was on 12 July 1968.

Basic price for a newly converted Carvair in 1960 was £150,000 (equivalent to £ million today), and based on the use of a C54 airframe, whilst only two of the three Ansett airframes supplied were of the DC4 variant.

Operational history

The Carvair was used by Aer Lingus, BUAF and BAF among others, and was used in Congo-Kinshasa during 1962–1963, under contract to the United Nations. Aircraft for Aer Lingus were quickly convertible between 55 seats and 22 seats with five cars. Some aircraft were pure freighters with only nine seats. One aircraft had 55 high-density seats and room for three cars. BAF was the last operator in Europe of the aircraft, keeping them flying into the 1970s.

Accidents and incidents

Of the 21 airframes, eight were destroyed in crashes:
 Rotterdam, Netherlands 1962
 Karachi, Pakistan 1967
 Twin Falls, Newfoundland and Labrador, Canada 1968
 Miami, Florida, United States 1969
 Le Touquet, France 1971
 Venetie, Alaska, United States 1997
 Griffin, Georgia, United States 1997
 McGrath, Alaska, United States 2007

The Carvair had entered service with Channel Air Bridge in February 1962 but the first loss happened to the 3rd delivered just 10 months later. On 28 December 1962 G-ARSF was on a scheduled service into Rotterdam's Zestienhoven Airport when, on approach to land during a snowstorm, it encountered white-out conditions, flew below the correct approach path and struck a perimeter dyke just short of the runway. In the first impact the aircraft lost one wing, then overturned after the second impact, crushing the flight deck area, but any fire was extinguished by the depth of snow that built up as the airplane slid along. The captain died but all passengers and the rest of the crew were safe and, having been with Channel Air Bridge for just over 5 months, G-ARSF was struck from the register in February 1963 and broken up at Southend Airport.

The first of two catastrophic incidents occurred at Karachi on 8 March 1967 when F-BMHU of Compagnie Air Transport (the fourth produced) suffered a double engine failure on take-off and, as a result of the large cargo carried and the rarified atmosphere, the aircraft lost height rapidly and the pilot was forced to make a landing on the National Highway near the airport but struck the Drigh Road railway bridge and several vehicles, killing four of the crew of six plus seven others on the ground.

The second catastrophic incident was near Miami, Florida on 23 June 1969 when HI-168 of Dominicana Aviation (the sixteenth produced), after three aborted taxi-outs due to the crew being unhappy with engine performance, finally took off just over the maximum gross take-off weight, but suffered again a double engine failure and in trying to return to the airport crashed into a main street east of the airport. When the entire fuel load exploded and caught fire, it set fire to many buildings despite the efforts of the 14 fire trucks that attended and took 45 minutes to quell the fire. The four crew and six on the ground were killed, with another 12 on the ground injured.

The accident at Griffin in the United States in April 1997 involved the fifth production Carvair which suffered catastrophic engine failure during the takeoff run and failed to become properly airborne. The aircraft crashed into a vacant Piggly Wiggly supermarket past the airport perimeter, killing both pilots.

Surviving aircraft

The 21st and final Carvair built, 9J-PAA, is in South Africa with Phoebus Apollo Aviation. Formerly registered in Zambia, the aircraft is currently on display at Rand Airport, where it sits near other uncommon aircraft such as the Boeing 747SP. Although now removed from the Zambian register, the owner plans to return it to the skies for air shows.

The second (N89FA / "Miss 1944", the 9th Carvair) is based in Gainesville, Texas at KGLE Gainesville Municipal Airport, and flies with Gator Global Flying Services on ad hoc cargo charters throughout the United States.

Another Carvair (N898AT, the 20th built) had been airworthy, but was written off after crashing while landing on 30 May 2007 at the airstrip at Nixon Fork Mine in Alaska.

Former operators

Ansett Australia

Eastern Provincial Airways

Dominicana de Aviación

Aviaco

 
 SF Air 
 SOACO
 Transport Aériens Réunis

Aer Lingus

Alisud

Interocean Airways

Nationwide Air

Phoebus Apollo Aviation

International Committee of the Red Cross

Tunis Air

British United Air Ferries and successor British Air Ferries (BAF)
Channel Air Bridge

Falcon Airways

Specifications

Notable appearances in media

British United Carvairs made an appearance in the 1964 James Bond movie Goldfinger as Auric Goldfinger and bodyguard Oddjob boarded G-ASDC bound for Switzerland while Goldfinger's Rolls-Royce car was being loaded through the Carvair nose. In the 1967 TV series The Prisoner in the episode "The Chimes of Big Ben", the plane is seen being loaded through the nose, then taking off and landing again. A Carvair serves as Charlie Marshall's plane in the John Le Carre novel The Honourable Schoolboy.

See also

Notes

References
 
 
 
  (2nd printing)
 
  (Airliner World online)

External links

Operators’ reference drawing 
Commercial Aircraft of the World Aviation Traders ATL-98 Carvair 
Aviation Traders Ltd. 
The Aviation Traders ATL-98 Carvair 
Aviation Traders Carvair 
DC-4 to Carvair, c/n 42994 history by Gil White 
ATL.98 Carvair N898AT in final stages of restoration 
Douglas DC-4-1009, Carvair ATL-98 Registration: N898AT 
30 May 2007: Carvair N898AT Wrecked
ASN Aviation Safety Database Aviation Traders ATL-98 Carvair 
Carvair in Goldfinger

Aviation Traders aircraft
1960s British cargo aircraft
Four-engined tractor aircraft
Low-wing aircraft
Douglas DC-4
Aircraft first flown in 1961
1960s British airliners
Four-engined piston aircraft